Nooralhaq Nasimi  (born 1967) is a former refugee who fled Afghanistan with his family, and who now campaigns for refugee rights in Europe and his former home country. In 2001 he founded the Afghanistan and Central Asian Association, a charity dedicated to helping refugees in London to integrate. He currently serves as the organisation's director and in 2011 he founded the European Campaign for Human Rights in Afghanistan, an organisation dedicated to raising awareness of the plight of Afghans worldwide.

Nasimi was born in Parwan Province before growing up Pul-e Khomri, Afghanistan. He was awarded an MA in law and PhD in Political Science from Mechnikov National University but this education and his time in the former USSR made him and his family a target for Taliban persecution. In 1999 Nasimi fled Afghanistan with his young family. After a three month journey he and his family crossed the English channel in the back of a refrigerated container to claim asylum in the United Kingdom. Inspired by the difficulties he faced integrating into British society and learning the English language, Nasimi established the Afghanistan and Central Asian Association in Lewisham in 2001. The charity is dedicated to helping refugees integrate and has since expanded to operate across London, offering services including language support, legal aid, a women's educational project and supplementary education programmes for child refugees. In 2018 Nasimi accepted the Queens Award for Voluntary Service on behalf of the ACAA for their work supporting refugees in London and was awarded the British Citizen Award for Volunteering and Charitable Giving in 2020.

Nasimi has been an active campaigner promoting the rights of Afghans in Afghanistan and campaigning for refugee rights around the world. In 2013 Nasimi travelled to Afghanistan and launched the country's first two Citizens Advice Bureaus, which have since helped over 7,500 people with issues ranging from domestic violence to poverty and employment. He has also supported refugees in migrant camps in Europe, lobbied politicians in the UK and at the EU and in 2011 launched the European Campaign for Human Rights in Afghanistan (ECHRA). The ECHRA has since held conferences in London, Germany and Greece bringing together experts in the fields of migration and human rights to collaborate on solutions to the migrant crisis and ways to protect human rights in the ongoing conflict in Afghanistan

Nasimi was appointed Member of the Order of the British Empire (MBE) in the 2023 New Year Honours for services to refugees.

References 

1967 births
Living people
Afghan refugees
Afghan emigrants to England
People from Parwan Province
Members of the Order of the British Empire
Naturalised citizens of the United Kingdom